Pantapath is an important east west road in Karwan Bazar area of Dhaka city, the capital of Bangladesh. It connects Tongi Diversion road, Mymenshing Road (now Old Airport Road) and Mirpur Road. It is home to one of South Asia's largest shopping centers, Bashundhara City. Other landmarks are Square Hospital, Samorita Hospital, Unique Trade Center, etc. Green Road intersects this road at about middle from north to south.  There was originally a canal connecting Hatirjeel-Begunbari with Dhanmondi Lake. But in late 1980, this east–west road was constructed. The construction of the road completed in 1995. Bangladesh Film Development Corporation (FDC) and Hotel Pan Pacific Sonargaon are also located on the eastern section of this road.   
There are two mosques in Pantapath.

References

 

Streets in Dhaka
Thanas of Dhaka
Transport in Dhaka
Neighbourhoods in Dhaka